USS Salute (MSO-470) was an  acquired by the U.S. Navy for the task of removing mines that had been placed in the water to prevent the safe passage of ships.

Salute was laid down on 17 March 1953 by the Luders Marine Construction Co., Stamford, Connecticut; launched on 14 August 1954; sponsored by Mrs. Frederick A. Edwards; reclassified MSO-470 on 7 February 1955; and commissioned on 4 May 1955.

Service history
Based at Charleston, South Carolina, Salute provided minesweeping services along the U.S. East Coast, in the Caribbean, and in the Mediterranean from 1955 to 1970. Duty with the 6th Fleet took her to the Mediterranean six times during this period.

Search for lost H-Bomb off Spain 
In March 1966, Salute used special equipment to aid in the search off the Spanish coast for an H-bomb lost in waters off Palomares after a mid-air bomber collision. In May 1967, she received visitors on board while at the world's fair at Montreal, Canada.

Inactivity and decommissioning 
She remained active in the U.S. Atlantic Fleet until decommissioned on 15 May 1970 for mine warfare conversion. However, on 16 October, her conversion was cancelled; she was struck from the Navy list on 1 February 1971 and was sold for scrapping in August to Charles Gural of Rahway, New Jersey for $1,700.

References 
 
 

 

Aggressive-class minesweepers
Ships built in Stamford, Connecticut
1954 ships